Yogamullaval is a 1971 Indian Malayalam-language film, directed by C. V. Shankar and produced by U. Parvathibhai. The film stars Muthukulam Raghavan Pillai, Shobha, Baby and C. V. Shankar. The film had musical score by R. K. Shekhar.

Cast

Muthukulam Raghavan Pillai
Shobha
Baby
C. V. Shankar
T. S. Muthaiah
Prem Navas
Abbas
Bahadoor
G. K. Pillai
K. P. Ummer
Khadeeja
Meena
Ramankutty
Thodupuzha Radhakrishnan
Vanchiyoor Radha
Vijayalatha
Saroja
Vijayalakshmi

Soundtrack
The music was composed by R. K. Shekhar and the lyrics were written by Sreekumaran Thampi.

References

External links
 

1971 films
1970s Malayalam-language films